Elizabeth Searle Lamb (January 22, 1917 – February 16, 2015) was an American poet. She is known for writing English-language haiku. Raymond Roseliep called her the "First Lady of American haiku". Her work has been translated into other languages.

Biography
She was born in Topeka, Kansas. She attended the University of Kansas and studied music and, in particular, she played the harp. She married F. Bruce Lamb in Trinidad in 1941. They lived in several places in South America due to her husband's job as a forester. They moved to New York in 1961.

She served as president of the Haiku Society of America in 1971.

She died in 2015 in Santa Fe, New Mexico.

Honors and awards
She was the honorary curator for the American Haiku Archives in the California State Library in Sacramento from 1996 to 1998.

Bibliography
 The pelican tree, and other Panama adventures, 1953
 Today and every day, 1970
 39 Blossoms, 1982
 Across the windharp: collected and new haiku, 1999

References

1917 births
2015 deaths
English-language haiku poets
American women poets
University of Kansas alumni
21st-century American women